A Constant Forge is a 2000 documentary film directed by Charles Kiselyak about the life and work of John Cassavetes.

It contains interviews with Cassavetes himself as well as recollections by actors who have worked with him and thoughts by admirers, including Lynn Carlin, Seymour Cassel, Peter Falk, John A. Gallagher, Ben Gazzara, Lelia Goldoni, Annette Insdorf, Carol Kane, Sean Penn, Gena Rowlands and Jon Voight.

External links

Reference links 

2000 films
American documentary films
Documentary films about film directors and producers
2000 documentary films
John Cassavetes
2000s English-language films
2000s American films